The R370 is a Regional Route in South Africa that connects Douglas with Jan Kempdorp.

Its south-western terminus is the R385 just north of Douglas. The route runs north-east, on the north bank of the Vaal River. It reaches the east/west N8 and is briefly cosigned heading east with it. It leaves the N8, at Schmidtsdrift, again heading north-east. It crosses the R31 between Ulco and Delportshoop. After another 40 kilometers it intersects the R371 and is briefly co-signed with it. It ends its route at the N18 at Jan Kempdorp but effectively continues as the R708.

External links
 Routes Travel Info

References

Regional Routes in the Northern Cape